was a Japanese samurai of the Sengoku period, who served the Mōri clan.

References

Mōri clan
Samurai